Sde Eliyahu (lit. Eliyahu Field) is a religious kibbutz in northern Israel. Located five kilometres south of Beit She'an, it falls under the jurisdiction of Valley of Springs Regional Council.

History

Sde Eliyahu was founded on 8 May 1939 by Jewish refugees from Nazi Germany as a tower and stockade settlement. It was named after the 19th-century Rabbi Eliyahu Guttmacher, one of the early leaders of Religious Zionism. It was part of a cluster of religious kibbutzim that includes Ein HaNatziv, Shluhot and Tirat Zvi.
 
After the 1948 Arab–Israeli War, Sde Eliyahu began to farm the land of the depopulated Palestinian village of Arab al-'Arida.

Economy
The kibbutz produces dates, olives, grapes, pomegranates, spices and field crops, as well as dairy cattle and poultry. Organic farming methods and non-pesticide management are used.

BioBee was established in 1983 as the Sde Eliyahu Biological Control Insectaries. The company mass-breeds and sells insects that are natural enemies of pests, sterile males of the Mediterranean fruit fly for pest control using the sterile insect technique, and bumblebees for pollination in greenhouses and open farmfields. In 2021, BioBee's use of persimilis, a predatory mite, to replace  chemical pesticides, won the Bernard Blum Award from the International Biocontrol Manufacturers Association in Basel, which named it the leading biocontrol solution of the year.

Education
"Shaked" is  a regional religious school  located on the kibbutz. The kibbutz also operates  a beit midrash, an  ulpan and a volunteer program; Students work three days a week and study three days a week, and are provided with their own dormitories, break room, and living area.

Notable people

 Moshe Unna, former member of the Knesset

References

External links
Official website

Kibbutzim
Religious Kibbutz Movement
Populated places established in 1939
1939 establishments in Mandatory Palestine
Populated places in Northern District (Israel)
German-Jewish culture in Israel